Davey and Goliath is a Christian clay-animated children's television series, whose central characters were created by Art Clokey, Ruth Clokey, and Dick Sutcliffe, and which was produced first by the United Lutheran Church in America and later by the Lutheran Church in America. The show was aimed at a youth audience, and generally dealt with issues such as respect for authority, sharing, and prejudice. Eventually, these themes included serious issues such as racism, death, religious intolerance and vandalism. Each 15-minute episode features the adventures of a boy named Davey Hansen and his "talking" dog Goliath (although only Davey and the viewer can hear him speak) as they learn the love of God through everyday occurrences. Many of the episodes also feature Davey's parents John and Elaine, his sister Sally, as well as Davey's friends: Jimmy, Teddy, and Nathaniel in earlier episodes, and Jonathan, Jimmy, Nicky, and Cisco in later ones.

In general, the characters find themselves in situations that have to be overcome by placing their faith in God. While the show is explicitly faith-based, there is no content specifically about the Lutheran Church, which made broadcasters more comfortable with the idea of an overtly religious mainstream children's show. The only reference to Lutherans in the show was the theme song, an instrumental version of "A Mighty Fortress Is Our God", and the Luther rose displayed in the opening theme and end credits.

Following Clokey's success with the Gumby series, Davey and Goliath premiered in syndication on February 25, 1961 as a Saturday feature, and lasted until 1965. By May 1961, it was reported that "Millions of children in cities and towns across the United States and Canada are talking about two new television stars, 'Davey and Goliath'."

Davey's friends Nathaniel (in the 1960s episodes) and Jonathan (in the 1970s episodes) were some of the first African-American characters to appear as friends of a television show's white lead character.

After its initial run, several 30-minute holiday-themed episodes were created in the late 1960s. The series then resumed with some new characters in 1971 and continued until 1973. In 1975, a final 30-minute summer episode was created. In 2004, Joe Clokey produced a new special, "Davey and Goliath's Snowboard Christmas".

History

Ordering the series 
In 1958, Franklin Clark Fry, president of the United Lutheran Church in America (ULCA), put aside $1 million to fund production of a future television program for children. Soon after, the ULCA contracted with Clokey Productions, Inc., headed by Gumby creators Art and Ruth Clokey, to create a new children’s show: Davey and Goliath. Scripts were written by children’s book author Nancy Moore in consultation with the church; Moore would go on to pen several episodes of the CBS Radio Mystery Theater in the 1970s and early 1980s.

The ULCA and Art Clokey teamed up to make the first Davey and Goliath episode in 1960, called "Lost in a Cave", which would be the first shown in syndication in 1961. In this premiere episode, the figures were entirely clay (with some latex/rubber clothing showing visible seams) and the scenery was also mostly clay. The early voices included Hal Smith (who did a number of voices including Davey's father), Dick Beals (who was Davey's voice) and Ginny Tyler (who did the voice of Sally's and Davey's mother). These three did many other voices as well.

After making "Lost in a Cave" in 1960, Clokey made "The Wild Goat", "Stranded on an Island" and "The Winner" in early 1961. In these episodes, the clay figures were now clothed with real cloth, and more model buildings and trees were added, making the episodes look somewhat more realistic. In 1961, the series of these four episodes began airing free on local television stations nationwide, ranging from ABC, NBC and CBS Network affiliates to independent stations.  Occasionally, two or more stations in the same market aired the show, at several times.  Many stations ran these episodes leading into network Saturday-morning lineups. Other stations ran them in religious Sunday-morning lineups between other evangelists' programs. By 1964, the show was airing in over 90% of U.S. television markets.

30 minute episodes
In 1965, Davey and Goliath returned to television when a 30-minute Christmas special called "Christmas Lost and Found" was aired. The episode was more overtly religious in nature and distanced itself from traditional Christmas figures such as Santa Claus and Rudolph, with religious Christmas songs included. This would also be the last episode featuring Dick Beals as the voice of Davey.

In 1967, three 30-minute holiday specials were aired: "Happy Easter" in March, "Halloween Who-Dun-It" in October, and "The New Year Promise" in December. By now the background music changed to an unknown music library, one that was also used in the Gumby episodes produced during that time. Davey was closer to junior high-school age and was voiced by Norma MacMillan. "Happy Easter" confronted the death of a loved one, as Davey's beloved grandmother dies suddenly (off-camera) within hours of a fun-filled visit.

Davey and Goliath's Snowboard Christmas 
After an almost 30-year hiatus, Davey and Goliath were next seen as part of a Mountain Dew soda commercial in 2001, with the royalties from the commercial used to fund the production of the 2004 Christmas special entitled Davey & Goliath's Snowboard Christmas. The holiday special addressed both religious and racial diversity as Davey demonstrates his snowboarding expertise to two friends: Sam, a Jewish boy, and Yasmeen, a Muslim girl.  During the course of the show, they get caught in an avalanche and end up in a cave. Goliath goes for help while Davey and his new friends find out that they really aren't all that different. The three children wind up learning of each other's holiday celebrations: Jewish Hanukkah, Christian Christmas and Muslim Eid.

Television airings 
The program had become a fixture on Saturday and/or Sunday mornings on TV stations (both religious and secular) across the country during the 1960s and 1970s. In the 1980s, commercial stations began gradually dropping the series. Religious stations picked it up in many markets and ran it in their blocks of Christian children's programs. By 1990, only a handful of commercial stations still aired the series.

The show continued to air on CatholicTV Network until late in 2009, on Tri-State Christian Television also until 2010 and still aired on a few local Christian television stations.

On cable, the Odyssey Network ran the entire series commercial-free from 1992 until 1999. Since the network's rebranding as the Hallmark Channel in 2001, they have only aired a few of the holiday specials with several commercial breaks, including the Snowboard Christmas special made in 2004. In 2008, iTunes began offering episodes as free downloads. By December of that year, more than 20 episodes had been made available. Nowadays, the episodes cost 99 cents each.

Until the beginning of October 2018, the series was shown on Trinity Broadcasting Network (TBN) Saturday afternoons, and during the week it was seen on the TBN-owned Smile of a Child network, which is carried on digital subchannels of TBN affiliates.

Parodies 
Adult Swim's Moral Orel is a darker, adult-oriented parody of Davey and Goliath. Though it is stylistically and thematically similar, the show's creator, Dino Stamatopoulos, claims Moral Orel had its genesis as  a parody of Leave It to Beaver.
MADtv spoofed Davey and Goliath in their fourteenth episode with "Davey and Son of Goliath", alluding to the Son of Sam serial killer who claimed a talking dog had instructed him to kill.
 The Simpsons featured a short, clay-animated segment titled "Gravey and Jobriath". Gravey is portrayed as a religious extremist building a pipe bomb in order to destroy Planned Parenthood.

List of episodes

Season 1 (1961)

Season 2 (1962–63)

Season 3 (1963–64)

Season 4 (1971–72)

Season 5 (1972–73)

Specials (1965–1975, 2004)

See also 
 Gumby
 Gumbasia
 Gumby: The Movie
 Art Clokey
 Wallace and Gromit
 VeggieTales
 Moral Orel

References

External links 
 Official website (archived July 1, 2020)
 A Davey and Goliath timeline at LivingLutheran.org
 Davey and Goliath Airtimes on TBN
 Davey and Goliath Airtimes on Smile of a Child
 Davey and Goliath at CEGAnMo.com
 
 Davey and Goliath at Toonopedia.com

1961 American television series debuts
1965 American television series endings
1971 American television series debuts
1973 American television series endings
1970s American animated television series
1960s American animated television series
American children's animated adventure television series
American children's animated education television series
Christian animation
Christian children's television series
Clay animation television series
Evangelical Lutheran Church in America
Animated television series about children
Animated television series about dogs
First-run syndicated television programs in the United States